Thlaspi, or pennycress, is a genus of herbs of temperate regions of the Eurasian continent. They occur in Central and South Europe, South-West Asia and two species are endemic to China.  The Thlaspi has been proven to be a hyperaccumulator of heavy metals such as zinc and cadmium and therefore may be used in phytoremediation initiatives.

Species 

  – roadside penny-cress
 Thlaspi arcticum – arctic penny-cress
 Thlaspi arvense – field penny-cress
 Thlaspi caerulescens – alpine penny-cress
 Thlaspi californicum – Kneeland Prairie penny-cress
 Thlaspi cyprium – Cyprus penny-cress
 Thlaspi fendleri – Fendler's penny-cress
 Thlaspi idahoense – Idaho penny-cress
  – Slovak penny-cress
 Thlaspi montanum – alpine penny-cress
 Thlaspi parviflorum – meadow penny-cress
 Thlaspi perfoliatum – Cotswold penny-cress
  – early penny-cress
  – round-leaved penny-cress

References

External links 
 

Brassicaceae
Brassicaceae genera